Hans Fitz (1891–1972) was a German actor and screenwriter.

Selected filmography
 Search for Majora (1949) 
 Who Is This That I Love? (1950)
 Fanfares of Love (1951)
 The Blue and White Lion (1952)
 Monks, Girls and Hungarian Soldiers (1952)
 Marriage Strike (1953)
 The Royal Waltz (1955)
 Her First Date (1955)
 Two Bavarians in the Jungle (1957)
 And Lead Us Not Into Temptation (1957)
 Two Bavarians in Bonn (1962)
 Hugo, the Woman Chaser (1969)

References

Bibliography
 Goble, Alan. The Complete Index to Literary Sources in Film. Walter de Gruyter, 1999.

External links

1891 births
1972 deaths
People from Neustadt an der Orla
People from Saxe-Weimar-Eisenach
German male television actors
German male film actors